Ine Karlsen Stangvik (born 4 April 1990) is a Norwegian handball player who plays for Molde Elite.

Achievements
Norwegian Cup:
Finalist: 2021

References 

1990 births
Living people
Handball players from Oslo
Norwegian female handball players
Expatriate handball players
Norwegian expatriate sportspeople in Denmark